Ceratina arizonensis is a species of small carpenter bee in the family Apidae. It is found in Central America and North America.

References

Further reading

External links

 

arizonensis
Articles created by Qbugbot
Insects described in 1898